The Cleveland Police and Crime Commissioner is the police and crime commissioner (PCC), an elected official tasked with setting out the way crime is tackled by Cleveland Police in the area of the former county of Cleveland in England. The post was created in November 2012, following an election held on 15 November 2012, and replaced the Cleveland Police Authority. The incumbent PCC is Steve Turner, who was elected in May 2021.

List of Cleveland Police and Crime Commissioners

References

External links
 

Police and crime commissioners in England